Samuel Termine (September 1, 1909 – May 1978) was an American weightlifter who competed in the 1932 Summer Olympics.

He was born in Mayfield, Pennsylvania and died in Las Vegas, Nevada.

In 1932 he finished seventh in the middleweight class.

External links
Profile

1909 births
1978 deaths
American male weightlifters
Olympic weightlifters of the United States
Weightlifters at the 1932 Summer Olympics
20th-century American people